The following is a list of films produced in the Kannada film industry in India in 1961, presented in alphabetical order.

See also
Kannada films of 1960
Kannada films of 1962

References

External links
 Kannada Movies of 1961's at the Internet Movie Database
 http://www.bharatmovies.com/kannada/info/moviepages.htm
 http://www.kannadastore.com/

1961
Lists of 1961 films by country or language
Films, Kannada